George Ross Rogge (September 3, 1907 – July 14, 1997) was an American football player. He played college football at Iowa and professional football in the National Football League (NFL) as an end for the Chicago Cardinals from 1931 to 1933 and for the St. Louis Gunners in 1934. He appeared in 24 NFL games, seven as a starter.

References

1907 births
1997 deaths
Iowa Hawkeyes football players
Chicago Cardinals players
St. Louis Gunners players
Players of American football from Iowa